D89 may refer to:
 D 89 road (United Arab Emirates)
 Grünfeld Defence, a chess opening
 , a C-class light cruiser of the Royal Navy
 , a Type 42 destroyer of the Royal Navy
 , a modified W-class destroyer of the Royal Navy